David Jenkins may refer to:

Entertainment
 David Jenkins (composer) (1848–1915), Welsh composer
 David Jenkins (musician) (born 1947), singer for the band Pablo Cruise
 David Jenkins (television writer), creator of People of Earth

Politics
 David Jenkins (North Carolina), 18th Century North Carolina politician, delegate at the First North Carolina Provincial Congress
 David Jenkins (abolitionist) (1811–1876), Mississippi politician and abolitionist
 David A. Jenkins (1822–1886), North Carolina State Treasurer, 1868–1876
 David James Jenkins (1824–1891), British MP for Penryn and Falmouth, 1874–1885
 David Jenkins (Georgia politician), American politician from Georgia

Religion
 David Jenkins (bishop) (1925–2016), of Durham
 David Jenkins (Archdeacon of Westmorland and Furness) (1929–2014), Anglican priest
 David Jenkins (archdeacon of Sudbury) (born 1961), Anglican priest

Sports
 David Morgan Jenkins (1901–1968), rugby union and rugby league footballer for Wales
 David Jenkins (rugby, born 1904) (1904–1951), rugby union and rugby league footballer for Wales
 David Jenkins (rugby, born 1914) (1914–1979), rugby union and rugby league footballer for Cardiff 
 David Jenkins (figure skater) (born 1936), American figure skater
 David Jenkins (footballer) (born 1946), English footballer for Arsenal and Tottenham Hotspur
 David Jenkins (sprinter) (born 1952), Scottish athlete
 Ab Jenkins (1883–1956), American racing car driver

Other
 David Jenkins (Royalist) (1582–1663), Welsh judge and Royalist during the English Civil War
 David P. Jenkins (1823–1915), American Civil War colonel
 David Jenkins, Baron Jenkins (1899–1969), British Law Lord
 David Jenkins (librarian) (1912–2002), Welsh librarian
 David Jenkins (British Army officer), British Army major general
 David J. Jenkins, professor of nutrition at the University of Toronto